Jupiter is an unincorporated community in Tuolumne County, California, in the United States. It was named for the nearby Jupiter mine. A post office was established in 1901 and closed in 1922.

References

Unincorporated communities in Tuolumne County, California
Unincorporated communities in California